"Un Blodymary" ("A Bloody Mary") is a song recorded by Spanish group Las Ketchup. The song was written by Manuel Ruiz Gómez "Queco". It is best known as the  entry at the Eurovision Song Contest 2006, held in Athens.

Eurovision Song Contest

Selection 
A submission period was open from 16 December 2005 until 31 January 2006. Only artists signed to record labels were eligible to submit entries and songs were required to be performed in one of the official languages of Spain. At the conclusion of the submission period, 245 entries were received. A committee evaluated the entries received and announced on 25 February 2006 during the La 1 evening magazine programme España Directo that four acts had been shortlisted to represent Spain at the 2006 contest: Chenoa, Las Ketchup, and former Spanish Eurovision contestants Azúcar Moreno and David Civera which represented Spain in 1990 and 2001, respectively. On 27 February 2006, TVE announced during España Directo that they had internally selected the group Las Ketchup to represent Spain in Athens. During the programme, it was also revealed that Las Ketchup would sing the song "Un Blodymary", written by Manuel Ruiz Gómez "Queco".

At Eurovision 
Spain's status (along with France, Germany and the United Kingdom) as one of the "Big Four" guaranteed the song a final berth. Thus it was performed sixth on the night, following 's Christine Guldbrandsen with "Alvedansen" and preceding 's Fabrizio Faniello with "I Do". At the close of voting, it had received 18 points, placing 21st in a field of 24.

The song was succeeded as Spanish entry by D'Nash with "I Love You Mi Vida".

Charts

External links
 Official Eurovision Song Contest site, history by year, 2006.
 Detailed info and lyrics, The Diggiloo Thrush, "Un Blodymary".

References

Songs about alcohol
Eurovision songs of Spain
Eurovision songs of 2006
Spanish-language songs
Las Ketchup songs
2006 songs
Warner Records singles
2006 singles